Searching Ruins on Broadway, Galveston, for Dead Bodies is a 1900 black-and-white silent film depicting the destruction caused by the Galveston hurricane on September 8, 1900. The film was produced by Edison Studios. It depicts laborers clearing debris searching for dead bodies. A body was found during the search.

See also 
 List of American films of 1900
 Galveston hurricane of 1900

External links 
 
 
 www.noaa.gov Galveston hurricane of 1900 

1900 films
1900s English-language films
American silent short films
American black-and-white films
Galveston, Texas
Galveston Hurricane of 1900
1900s short documentary films
Black-and-white documentary films
Articles containing video clips
Documentary films about disasters
American short documentary films
1900s American films